Sulcatone (6-methyl-5-hepten-2-one) is an unsaturated methylated ketone with the molecular formula C8H14O.  It is a colorless, water-like liquid with a citrus-like, fruity odor.

Sulcatone is one of a number of mosquito attractants, especially for those species such as Aedes aegypti with the odor receptor gene Or4.

References 

Ketones